Ibtada (Urdu for 'the beginning') is a not-for-profit, non-governmental development organisation headquartered in Alwar, India working in the Mewat region of Rajasthan. It is a small endeavor to mainstream the deprived women of this region by organizing, educating and empowering them. It was founded in 1997 by Rajesh Singhi after he conducted the Benchmark Survey of Mewat for the Government of Rajasthan.

Ibtada works in about 400 villages in 6 Blocks of Alwar, Rajasthan. This is the most backward region of Mewat and is dominated by Meo-Muslims, the traditional peasantry class. Though converted to Islam 14th century onwards, the Meos still practice many Hindu customs and traditions. The region suffers extreme social and economic backwardness due to lack of resources, awareness, education, health and on account of poor gender status.

History 
Ibtada is a non-profit organization with a mission to empower women and girls in India. The organization was founded in 1997 by Rajesh Singhi, and initially focused on the formation of self-help groups (SHGs). By March 1999, Ibtada had formed 16 SHGs, which grew to 142 by 2001, and over 2000 at present.

In addition to forming SHGs, Ibtada has established upper tier institutions, including 68 clusters and 4 federations. The organization has also implemented livelihood interventions in the areas of agriculture and animal husbandry, with goat rearing being a key intervention involving over 500 families. Ibtada has also focused on developing the skills of women, enabling them to work as Resource Persons for their communities. Through this process, Ibtada has developed women as Pashu Sakhies, Krishi Sakhies, Swasthya Sakhies, Shiksha Sakhies, and Adhikar Sakhies.

Ibtada's girl child education program began in August 2000, with 7 learning centers (called Taleemshalas). This program has since grown to encompass 121 learning centers as of 2011. The Taleemshalas provide education to out-of-school girls up to Class V, after which they are mainstreamed into government schools. However, following the implementation of the Right to Education (RTE) in 2009, Ibtada began working with government schools to improve their quality and involve the community in their functioning. Currently, Ibtada's government school program covers 100 schools in the Ramgarh and Kishangarh blocks, and also includes an Upper Primary School in Gwalda.

Initiatives

Savings credit based institutions 
Promoting community-based institutions for women empowerment is the core to Ibtada’s mission. These institutions empower women - to change power relations in their family and in the society, to foster decision-making power among women, to enhance their degree of control over resources and provide them space for visibility and collective action. Ibtada’s three tier Institutional architecture (SHGs, Clusters and Federations or Manch) forms the base for implementing different programmes for Financial Inclusion, Livelihoods, Girls Empowerment and Rights & Entitlements. Ibtada has promoted 10 federations until now including 5 for the NRLM. Currently, four federations- Chetna, Kranti, Sangharsh, and Savera, registered as Trusts work autonomously with handholding support from Ibtada.

Women-led livelihoods 
Entrepreneurship amongst women is promoted by providing them with market knowledge as well as financial help. Women members of the SHGs can secure loans to start small shops in their village thus reducing their dependence on agriculture or animal husbandry based income. Women are also provided market knowledge to source stock and Ibtada provides hand holding support for maintaining accounts. As part of this intervention, many women have opened shops of cosmetics, general stores, animal feed, tailoring, etc. and are earning additional income.

Education 
Education has been a primary focus of Ibtada's initiatives with introduction of school libraries, Bal sansads as well as supplementary classes. They've also worked in order to improve infrastructure in government schools and have facilitated the formation and functioning of School Management committees.

Girl Empowerment

Rights and entitlements

Campaigns

Ek Jodi Kapda 
In 2010, the Ek Jodi Kapda project was launched along with Whirlpool Corporation where various centers were opened to collect donated clothes.

Joy of Exchange 
In 2011, the Joy of Exchange  campaign was a joint initiative by Pantaloons Fashion & Retail Limited and Goonj. Drop boxes were set up at various Pantaloons offices pan India.

Share the Language of Love 
In 2013, this is a joint effort by Johnson's Baby India in association with Goonj. Various dropping centers were set up to collect children clothes, toys, books and other belongings.

Look Good Do good 
In 2016, the Look Good Do Good project was initiated along with Raymond which offered free custom tailoring services on new pair of trousers in exchange of old trousers. This Trouser Exchange Program offered every customer of Raymond a chance to give away their old trousers that would reach to people in need.

Flood relief 

Awards 

 2004: Goonj won Changemaker’s Innovation Award for its School to School initiative.

References

External links 

 
 

Charities based in India